The 1960–61 NBA season was the Nationals' 12th season in the NBA.

Regular season

Season standings

x – clinched playoff spot

Record vs. opponents

Game log

Playoffs

|- align="center" bgcolor="#ccffcc" 
| 1
| March 14
| @ Philadelphia
| W 115–107
| Larry Costello (28)
| Swede Halbrook (15)
| Larry Costello (11)
| Philadelphia Civic Center4,391
| 1–0
|- align="center" bgcolor="#ccffcc" 
| 2
| March 16
| Philadelphia
| W 115–114
| Hal Greer (26)
| Dolph Schayes (14)
| Larry Costello (6)
| Onondaga War Memorial5,304
| 2–0
|- align="center" bgcolor="#ccffcc" 
| 3
| March 18
| @ Philadelphia
| W 106–103
| Larry Costello (20)
| Red Kerr (18)
| Larry Costello (8)
| Philadelphia Civic Center
| 3–0
|-

|- align="center" bgcolor="#ffcccc" 
| 1
| March 19
| @ Boston
| L 115–128
| Dolph Schayes (26)
| —
| Schayes, Costello (6)
| Boston Garden7,728
| 0–1
|- align="center" bgcolor="#ccffcc" 
| 2
| March 21
| Boston
| W 115–98
| Dolph Schayes (32)
| —
| Larry Costello (9)
| Onondaga War Memorial6,657
| 1–1
|- align="center" bgcolor="#ffcccc" 
| 3
| March 23
| @ Boston
| L 110–133
| Dick Barnett (22)
| Red Kerr (11)
| Larry Costello (4)
| Boston Garden11,754
| 1–2
|- align="center" bgcolor="#ffcccc" 
| 4
| March 25
| Boston
| L 107–120
| Dolph Schayes (23)
| —
| Barnett, Costello (4)
| Onondaga War Memorial
| 1–3
|- align="center" bgcolor="#ffcccc" 
| 5
| March 26
| @ Boston
| L 101–123
| Dick Barnett (25)
| Swede Halbrook (14)
| four players tied (4)
| Boston Garden12,292
| 1–4
|-

Awards and records
Dolph Schayes, All-NBA Second Team
Larry Costello, All-NBA Second Team

References

Philadelphia 76ers seasons
Syracuse
Syracuse
Syracuse